Otto Arndt (19 July 1920 – 3 February 1992) was an East German politician who served as minister of transport and General Director of the Deutsche Reichsbahn from 1970 until 1989.

Biography
The son of a locomotive driver, Arndt was born in Aschersleben in 1920 and was trained as a locksmith. He served in the Luftwaffe during World War II with the rank of Obergefreiter. After the war, he trained to become a railway inspector and began his career in the Reichsbahn. Arndt was also very politically active and was a founding member of the Socialist Unity Party in the newly-created German Democratic Republic.

In 1970, Arndt succeeded Erwin Kramer as Minister of Transport and Director of the Deutsche Reichsbahn and served in those capacities until he resigned alongside other government ministers in November 1989. He was also a member of the Volkskammer until March 1990.

See also
Council of Ministers of East Germany
Transport in the German Democratic Republic

References

External links

1920 births
1992 deaths
People from Aschersleben
People from the Province of Saxony
Social Democratic Party of Germany politicians
Members of the Central Committee of the Socialist Unity Party of Germany
Government ministers of East Germany
Transport ministers
Members of the 7th Volkskammer
Members of the 8th Volkskammer
Members of the 9th Volkskammer
Luftwaffe personnel of World War II
Recipients of the Banner of Labor